Lowell Douglas English (born August 25, 1953) is an American former professional football player who was a defensive tackle for the Detroit Lions (1975–1985) of the National Football League (NFL).

Early years
English was born in Dallas, Texas. He graduated from Bryan Adams High School.

College career
English attended the University of Texas, graduating in 1976 with a major in History. He helped the Texas Longhorns to three Southwest Conference titles. He was also a member of the Texas Cowboys. In 2011, he was inducted into the College Football Hall of Fame.

Professional career
Along with defensive end Al "Bubba" Baker, English was a cornerstone of the Lions’ feared "Silver Rush" defensive line of the late 70’s and early 80’s. The 6-foot-5, 255 pound English was Detroit’s second-round pick in 1975 out of the University of Texas. In 1979, after recording 122 tackles (90 solo) and 6.5 sacks, English was voted as the team’s Defensive MVP. After a year off due to chronic injuries that were hampering his play, English rejoined the Lions prior to 1981 season.

English’s best season came in 1983, when he recorded 13 sacks and two safeties, making him only one of 17 NFL players to record two safeties in a single season. That year, the Lions won the NFC Central Division title with a 9-7 mark, and lost to the San Francisco 49ers, 24-23, in the divisional round. Upon the arrival of new coach Darryl Rogers in 1985, English was moved to nose tackle in the team’s new 3-4 defensive alignment. His career ended after that season due to a serious neck injury. He finished his career with 55.5 sacks, which places him ninth on the Lions’ all-time list. He was named First-team All-Pro in 1982 and Second-team three times (1981, 1983–84). He also went to four Pro Bowls (1979, 1982–84). English had 4 safeties throughout his career, tying him with Ted Hendricks, Jared Allen and Justin Houston for the most safeties in NFL history.

Later years
English became co-owner with Louie Kelcher, a former college rival with the SMU Mustangs, in the warehousing firm Pro Line Warehouse and Distribution.

He is also the President of the Lone Star Paralysis Foundation.

References

1953 births
Living people
Bryan Adams High School alumni
American football defensive linemen
Detroit Lions players
National Conference Pro Bowl players
Players of American football from Dallas
Texas Longhorns football players
College Football Hall of Fame inductees